Hansl Krönauer (23 April 1932 in Benediktbeuern - 21 March 2011) was a German folk-singer and composer.

His career started around 1955 when he performed typical Bavarian music. In 1970, he had his first and biggest success Golden schimmern meine Berge, a Number-1-Hit for three months in German folk-charts Lustige Musikanten. In 1971, Golden schimmern meine Berge was elected the most popular German folk-song of the year. Other successful titles followed until 1990.

He later ran a restaurant in Benediktbeuern. He was married and had a daughter who is also a singer.

Selected discography 
 "Golden schimmern meine Berge" (1970)
 "Sohn der herrlichen Berge" (1971)
 "Westerwald, wie bist du schön" (1977)
 "Der König und die Sennerin" (1984)
 "Fremde Erde" (1986)
 "Die allerschönste Mundart" (1987)
 "Das Mutterlied" (1990)

References

German male singers
German composers
1932 births
2011 deaths
20th-century German male musicians
20th-century German musicians